Waterpipe or water pipe may refer to:
Water pipe, a pipe to feed water
Hookah, a smoking device
Bong, a smoking device